RAVSIGUR, a shortening of  ('Directorate for Public Order and Security'), later known as GRAVSIGUR in 1943, was a Croatian supervisory department in the Ministry of Internal Affairs. The purpose of the department was to supervise police activities in Croatia. The system was similar in concept to that used in Germany under the Third Reich.

References
Notes

General references
Hory, Ladislaus and Martin Broszat (1964) Der Kroatische Ustascha-Staat 1941-1945 (Stuttgart: Deutsche Verlags-Anstalt), p.146; NARA Washington, DC: RG 242 (T-315 roll 2271/172); (T-821 roll 278/478-79; roll 448/670).

Independent State of Croatia
Law enforcement in Croatia
Secret police
1941 establishments in Croatia
1945 disestablishments in Croatia